Althea Violet Alexis-Windsor (born 22 June 1973), is a Judge of the International Criminal Court. She has been a high court judge of Trinidad and Tobago.

Early life

In 1989, she received her graduation from Vessigny Government School. She was honored to deliver the valedictorian speech.
In 1991, she finished from St. Joseph's Convent in San Fernando, Trinidad and Tobago with GCE Advanced Level.

Legal career 

In 1994, Althea Alexis-Windsor received her Bachelor of Laws and Letters (LLB) degree from the University of the West Indies. In 1996, she finished from Hugh Wooding Law School with the Commonwealth Caribbean's Legal Education Certificate. After holding positions as associate attorney at law and junior counsel in two law chambers (law firms), in 1998 she was appointed state counsel I. In 2000 / 2001 she went to Utrecht for a Master of Law and Letters (LLM) class. She graduated magna cum laude. After a year as Deputy Director of the Ministry of the Attorney General's Human Rights Unit, she returned to the Office of the Director of Public Prosecutions and became a Senior State Counsel.

From 2004 to 2013 she joined the International Criminal Tribunal for Rwanda, beginning as an Assistant Trial Counsel, she progressed to a Trial Counsel position, and became an Appeals Counsel.

In September 2013, she was appointed judge of the High Court of Trinidad and Tobago, " adjudicating on complex matters of criminal law and procedure in pretrial submissions and on-going trials of murder, sexual offences and narcotics. " and therefore also of the Supreme Court. 

On 23rd of Dezember 2020, she was elected Judge of the International Criminal Court. She entered office 11 March 2021. In her application speech in the ICC-ASP "public roundtable" discussion she named three "I-believes": "I believe in the ability of the law to help build fearless and justice in a society. I believe that with international criminal law this ability becomes ~Word not understood~ large. I believe that the International Criminal Court is the vehicle that will positively affect national jurisdictions by strengthening local criminal capacity and encouraging international respect for the rule of law. Therein lies the source of my passion."

Notes

References

1973 births
Living people
International Criminal Court judges
Trinidad and Tobago judges of international courts and tribunals
University of the West Indies alumni
Utrecht University alumni